The Czech Hydrometeorological Institute (CHMI) is the central state office of the Czech Republic in the fields of air quality, meteorology, climatology and hydrology. It is an organization established by the Ministry of the Environment of the Czech Republic. The head office and centralized workplaces of the CHMI, including the data processing, telecommunication and technical services, are located at the Institute's own campus in Prague.

History
The National Meteorological Institute was established in 1919 shortly after Czechoslovakia was established at the end of World War I. On 1 January 1954, the National Meteorological Institute was united with the hydrology service and the Czech Hydrometeorological Institute was established. Its charter was amended in 1994 and in 1995 by the Ministry of the Environment of the Czech Republic.

Structure

The CHMI is made up of three specialized sections (meteorology and climatology section, hydrology section, and air quality section) with two support sections (finance and administration and Information technology (IT) section), and finally, the director section.

In addition to the central office in Prague-Komořany, the CHMI has a regional offices (branches) in six other Czech cities, not all sections are represented in each branch. Those other offices are in Brno, Ostrava, Plzeň, Ústí nad Labem, Hradec Králové, and České Budějovice.

Air pollution dispersion modelling activities
The Air Quality division has seven departments:

Air Quality Information System
Emission and Sources
Modelling and Expertise Pool
National Inventorization System
Air Quality Monitoring
Central Air Quality Laboratory
Calibration Laboratory

The work of the Modelling and Expertise Pool department is focused upon: the development of air pollution dispersion models; the application of such models in the preparation of expert reports and opinions; forecasts of air quality control; the processing of operating information on pollutant concentrations obtained by the Airborne Monitoring section.

The SYMOS97 air pollution dispersion model was developed at the CHMI. It models the dispersion of continuous, neutral or buoyant plumes from single or multiple point, area or line sources. It can handle complex terrain and it can also be used to simulate the dispersion of cooling tower plumes.

See also
 List of atmospheric dispersion models
 FMI, the Finnish Meteorological Institute
 KNMI, the Royal Dutch Meteorological Institute
 NILU, the Norwegian Institute for Air Research
 Swedish Meteorological and Hydrological Institute
 Royal Meteorological Society

References

External links

CMHI website (English version)

Governmental meteorological agencies in Europe
Science and technology in the Czech Republic
Environment of the Czech Republic
Atmospheric dispersion modeling
Air pollution
Science and technology in Czechoslovakia
1954 establishments in Czechoslovakia